Petkus may refer to:

Viktoras Petkus (1928-2012), Lithuanian political activist and dissident, political prisoner, 
Andrius Petkus, Lithuanian sculptor
Josef Petkus, a member of the fictional Red Guardian team of the Supreme Soviets in Marvel Universe
Almantas Petkus, Lithuanian politician, Member of the Seimas, 2008–2012
Petkus, a former municipality, now part of Baruth/Mark, Berlin
Petkus (variety)